Ayesha Siddiqa Girls School is an Islamic school in Southall, London Borough of Ealing, West London, England. It is located on the second and third floors of the Abu Bakr Mosque.

References

External links

 Ayesha Siddiqa Girls School

Private schools in the London Borough of Ealing
Islamic schools in London
Private girls' schools in London